The Tenant Farmers Association is an organisation which represents the interests of tenant farmers in England and Wales, it provides advice to its members and lobbies government. The TFA was formed in 1981 and has its head office in Reading, Berkshire. The association has a team of employed staff in addition to elected regional chairmen, the current national chairman is James Gray.

References

External links 
 Tenant Farmers Association

Agricultural organisations based in the United Kingdom
Organisations based in Berkshire
Farmers' organizations